Mother of Storms is a 1994 science fiction novel by American writer John Barnes. It was nominated for three major science fiction awards.

Plot summary
In the early 21st century, the Earth suffers from a giant hurricane spawned by the release of clathrate compounds, as the result of a nuclear explosion. While the hurricane spawns hundreds of progeny, which, by novel's end, kill at least 1 billion people, two massively computer augmented human intelligences, both of whom witness their organic bodies die, race to corral a comet from beyond Pluto's orbit. They use the ice from the comet to reduce the Earth's surface temperatures, and quell the mother of storms.

Scientific ideas referenced
The clathrate gun hypothesis is the basis for the origin of the hurricane.

Award nominations
1995 – Locus Poll Award, Best Science Fiction Novel nominee
1995 – Arthur C. Clarke Award, shortlist
1995 – Hugo Award, Best Novel nominee
1996 – Nebula Award, Best Novel nominee

Translations
French
La Mère des Tempêtes, translated by Jean-Daniel Brèque. Le Livre de Poche (2001), 
Romanian
Uraganele, translated by Gabriel Stoian. Editura Nemira (1999)

References

External links

Mother of Storms at Macmillan Publishers website

American science fiction novels
American post-apocalyptic novels
1994 American novels
Climate change books
1994 science fiction novels
Tor Books books